The mixed team competition of the Golf events at the 2015 Pan American Games was held between July 16 and 19 at the Angus Glen Golf Club in Markham, Ontario.

Schedule
All times are Eastern Standard Time (UTC-3).

Results
The final results were:

References

Golf at the 2015 Pan American Games